Labeo chariensis is a species of freshwater fish belonging to the genus Labeo. It is found in the Congo River basin.

References

chariensis
Taxa named by Jacques Pellegrin
Fish described in 1904